Psychiatric somatotherapy (or somatic therapy) is the treatment of mental illness by physical means (such as medication, electroconvulsive therapy, or psychosurgery) rather than psychotherapy.

References 

Somatic psychology